is a Japanese professional footballer who plays as a full back for Japanese club FC Tokyo and the Japan national team.

A graduate from the Meiji University, Nagatomo started his professional career with FC Tokyo in 2007, quickly establishing himself as a first choice both within the team and the Japanese national team. He would go on to play in Europe for over a decade, first joining Cesena in 2010, and then enjoying stints with Inter Milan (where he played for seven years, making more than 200 total appearances and even captaining the team for a brief period of time), Galatasaray and Olympique Marseille. He would then go back to his boyhood club FC Tokyo in September 2021.

During his club career, he won a J.League Cup in 2009 (with Tokyo), a Coppa Italia in 2011 (with Inter Milan), two back-to-back Turkish titles in 2018 and 2019, both a Turkish Cup and a Turkish Super Cup in 2019 (all with Galatasaray). He also won an individual award as AFC's Asian International Player of the Year in 2013.

With 142 caps (as well as four goals), Nagatomo is Japan's second-most capped player of all time, behind only Yasuhito Endō. Having won his first cap for the Samurai Blue in 2008, just some months after making his professional debut with FC Tokyo, the full-back has represented Japan at one edition of the Olympic Games (in 2008), four consecutive World Cups (in 2010, 2014, 2018 and 2022), three consecutive Asian Cups (in 2011, 2015 and 2019) and one Confederations Cup (in 2013). He was part both of the squad that won the Asian Cup in 2011 and the one that finished as runners-up in the same competition in 2019.

Club career

FC Tokyo
Nagatomo officially signed with FC Tokyo in 2008, while at Meiji. But he made an appearance at J.League Cup as Special Designated Youth Player in 2007. Nagatomo made 84 appearances in his four years at FC Tokyo.

Cesena
In July 2010, Nagatomo was signed on loan by the newly promoted Serie A side Cesena, where he played the first half of the season as Cesena's starting left back. Before moving to Italy, Nagatomo gave a speech to 25,000 supporters just after the match involving F.C. Tokyo and Vissel Kobe on 17 July 2010. After being signed on a permanent deal, Nagatomo was then sold to Internazionale.

Internazionale

Due to his impressive performances for both Cesena and Japan in the 2011 Asian Cup, he was fully signed by Cesena in January 2011. But before making any league appearances he was sent straight out on loan to Internazionale in exchange for Davide Santon also on loan, becoming the first East Asian player to sign with Internazionale.

Nagatomo, wearing number 55, made his debut for Nerazzurri on 6 February 2011, replacing Wesley Sneijder in the Serie A match against Roma, won by Inter 5–3. In the following game, Nagatomo came on as a late substitute against Juventus, before starting in both of the following games against Fiorentina and Cagliari. Nagatomo showed his versatility by playing right back against Sampdoria on 27 February, and finishing the whole 90 minutes. On 6 March 2011, Nagatomo scored his first goal for Inter in the 5–2 trashing of Genoa on a Kharja assist with a swivel and a finish into the roof of the net.

On 15 March, to show solidarity with his home country in light of the catastrophic earthquake and tsunami which took place the previous week he paraded the Japanese flag (with the writing "You'll Never Walk Alone", a chant of his former team in Tokyo) around the pitch during a Champions League match against Bayern Munich.
Inter had drawn German club side Schalke 04 in the quarter-finals of Champions League. Nagatomo, along with international teammate Atsuto Uchida, who played for Schalke, became the second and third Japanese footballer to play in the quarter-finals of the UEFA Champions league. (Keisuke Honda was the first, playing for CSKA Moscow during 2009–10 season).

After the Serie A season was over, Internazionale made an agreement with Cesena of making Yuto's move permanent in a cash plus player exchange deal. Nagatomo was valued at €10.95 million, however part of the fee was paid via half of the registration rights of Luca Garritano (€700,000) and Luca Caldirola (€2.5 million).

Nagatomo started his second Inter Milan season by playing 62 minutes in the opening Serie A match against Palermo, ended in a 4–3 away defeat. On 27 September 2011, Nagatomo provided an assist for Giampaolo Pazzini by nutmegging Aleksei Berezutski before driving the ball across goal during the 3–2 away win against CSKA Moscow in the second group stage match of Champions League. He scored his first goal of the season on 10 December 2011 during the 2–0 home win against Fiorentina in the matchday 15 of Serie A. He was again in the scoresheet three days later as he headed home a Ricky Álvarez cross in the 1–0 win against Genoa. In the last match of 2011 against Lecce at home, Nagatomo produced a "man of the match" performance by providing two assists in an eventual 4–1 win.

Nagatomo enjoyed his most productive season under Walter Mazzarri, scoring five goals, along with six assists during the 2013–14 season.

Nagatomo lost his place in the starting lineup in the 2014–15 season, making only 14 league appearances. He captained Inter for the first time on 28 September 2014 in the 2014–15 Serie A matchday 5 versus Cagliari, leaving the field in the 27th minutes after receiving two yellow cards in 120 seconds as Inter was defeated 1–4 at San Siro. Nagatomo said that he had turned down a January 2016 offer from Premier League outfit Manchester United, stating that his intentions were to renew with Inter.

On 8 April 2016, Nagatomo agreed a contract extension with the club, signing until June 2019. During the 2016–17 season, he played 20 matches in all competitions, including 16 in league, 11 of them as starter, as Inter finished 7th in championship, was eliminated in the quarter-final of Coppa Italia by Lazio, and finished bottom in Europa League Group K.

Nagatomo improved his game at the start of 2017–18 season under new manager Luciano Spalletti, winning his place once again. His 200th official appearance for Inter occurred on 16 September 2017 in the matchday 3 match at  Crotone, winning a free kick that lead to the first goal in an eventual 0–2 win. Later on 12 December, Nagatomo played 120 minutes in the 2017–18 Coppa Italia round of 16 fixture against underdogs of Pordenone. The match went to penalty shootouts where he netted the winning penalty in the 5–4 penalty shootout that led Internazionale to the victory and progression to quarter-finals.

Galatasaray
On 31 January 2018, Nagatomo joined Turkish club Galatasaray on loan for the remainder of the 2017–18 season. On 30 June 2018 the deal was made permanent.

Marseille
On 31 August 2020, Nagatomo signed with Ligue 1 club Marseille on a free transfer. He made his first appearance for the club in a 1–1 league draw against Lille on 20 September 2020.

International career
Nagatomo earned his first international cap for Japan on 24 May 2008 in a friendly against Ivory Coast. His first international goal was scored in a friendly against Syria held on 13 November 2008. Nagatomo was also a member of the Japan U-21 team for the 2008 Summer Olympics.

2010 FIFA World Cup
He was called up for the 2010 FIFA World Cup for Japan.

2011 AFC Asian Cup
Nagatomo was selected as part of the Japan squad for the 2011 AFC Asian Cup by coach Alberto Zaccheroni. He featured in every game Japan played in the competition and helped them defeat Australia in the final, thus earning his first international honour.

2013 FIFA Confederations Cup
He was included in Alberto Zaccheroni's 23-man Japan squad for the 2013 FIFA Confederations Cup where he featured in the three games before they were eliminated in the group stage.

2014 FIFA World Cup and later

Nagatomo was part of Japan's national squad to play in the 2014 World Cup in Brazil. He started in all three group matches but Japan was eliminated in the group stage.

Nagatomo earned his 100th international cap on 10 November 2017 by captaining his side in the 1–3 friendly loss to Brazil at Stade Pierre-Mauroy, Lille. This made his only the 7th Japan player to achieve the feat.

Later, he was selected for 2018 World Cup and 2019 Asian Cup.

Currently with 124 caps he is second most capped nation's player.

Personal life
Nagatomo is married to Japanese actress Airi Taira. The couple had maintained a long-distance relationship for several years as Taira was based in Japan. Nagatomo proposed to her on the San Siro pitch in February 2016 and they registered their marriage in January 2017. They have 3 sons. Both of them appeared in the Captain Tsubasa Olympics special which, aired as part of the annual Jikan Terebi Nihon no Sport wa Tsuyo in November 2019.

He pursued a degree in Political Economy at the Meiji University, where he graduated in 2007.

Career statistics

Club

International

Scores and results list Japan's goal tally first, score column indicates score after each Nagatomo goal.

Honours
Tokyo
J.League Cup: 2009

Inter Milan
Coppa Italia: 2010–11

Galatasaray
Süper Lig: 2017–18,  2018–19
Turkish Cup:  2018–19
Turkish Super Cup: 2019

Japan
AFC Asian Cup: 2011

Individual
J.League Best XI: 2009
AFC Asian International Player of the Year: 2013
 AFC Asian Cup Team of the Tournament: 2019
AFC Opta All-time World Cup XI: 2020

See also
List of footballers with 100 or more caps

References

External links

1986 births
Living people
Meiji University alumni
People from Saijō, Ehime
Association football people from Ehime Prefecture
Japanese footballers
Japan international footballers
J1 League players
Serie A players
Süper Lig players
Ligue 1 players
FC Tokyo players
A.C. Cesena players
Inter Milan players
Galatasaray S.K. footballers
Olympique de Marseille players
Olympic footballers of Japan
Footballers at the 2008 Summer Olympics
2010 FIFA World Cup players
2011 AFC Asian Cup players
AFC Asian Cup-winning players
2013 FIFA Confederations Cup players
2014 FIFA World Cup players
2015 AFC Asian Cup players
2018 FIFA World Cup players
2019 AFC Asian Cup players
2022 FIFA World Cup players
Japanese expatriate footballers
Expatriate footballers in Italy
Japanese expatriate sportspeople in Italy
Expatriate footballers in Turkey
Japanese expatriate sportspeople in Turkey
Expatriate footballers in France
Japanese expatriate sportspeople in France
Association football defenders
FIFA Century Club